Alexander Lambie (15 April 1897 – 26 February 1963) was a Scottish footballer who played as a centre half.

Career

Club
Although he began his career with Ayrshire teams including Kilmarnock, Lambie featured primarily for Glasgow club Partick Thistle where he spent a decade (all in the top division), making 325 appearances for the Jags in all competitions and scoring 17 goals, having been brought in during 1921 as a replacement for Willie Hamilton, the regular of the past decade who had died of tuberculosis.

He played in the 1930 Scottish Cup Final which Partick lost to Rangers after a replay, but did manage to claim winner's medals in the Glasgow Merchants Charity Cup in 1927 and the one-off Glasgow Dental Hospital Cup in 1928, both against the same opponents.

After he moved on from Partick Thistle in 1931, a spell at Chester lasting just a few weeks was followed by three seasons as a regular at Swindon Town, and then further brief period in Wales with Lovell's Athletic and Ireland with Distillery before retiring.

International
While playing for Partick Thistle, Lambie was selected once for the Scottish Football League XI against the English Football League XI in 1928, and took part in what proved to be the last Home Scots v Anglo-Scots international trial match in the same year, although this did not lead to a full cap for Scotland. He also played in two editions of the Glasgow Football Association's annual challenge match against Sheffield.

Personal life
His nephews Jim, Jock and Tom Brown were all footballers, and their sons also became sportsmen.

References

1897 births
1963 deaths
Footballers from South Ayrshire
People from Troon
Scottish footballers
Association football central defenders
Scottish Junior Football Association players
Troon F.C. players
Partick Thistle F.C. players
Kilmarnock F.C. players
Chester City F.C. players
Swindon Town F.C. players
Lovell's Athletic F.C. players
Lisburn Distillery F.C. players
English Football League players
Scottish Football League players
Scottish Football League representative players